A Little Princess is a 1995 American family drama film directed by Alfonso Cuarón and starring Eleanor Bron, Liam Cunningham (in a dual role), and introducing Liesel Matthews as Sara Crewe with supporting roles by Vanessa Lee Chester, Rusty Schwimmer, Arthur Malet and Errol Sitahal. It was distributed by Warner Bros. through their Warner Bros. Family Entertainment label.

Set during World War I, it focuses on a young girl who is relegated to a life of servitude in a New York City boarding school by the headmistress after receiving news that her father was killed in combat. Loosely based upon the 1905 novel A Little Princess by Frances Hodgson Burnett, this adaptation was heavily influenced by the 1939 cinematic version and takes creative liberties with the original story.

Although not a box office success, it was critically acclaimed and received various awards, including two Oscar nominations for its significant achievements in art direction and cinematography.

Plot

In 1914, young Sara lives in India with her widowed father Captain Richard Crewe, a wealthy British Army officer, sharing his love for stories of myths and magic. Called to serve in the Great War, Richard enrolls Sara at the all-girls' boarding school in New York City attended by her late mother, run by the haughty headmistress Miss Maria Minchin and her kindly sister Amelia. Instructing Miss Minchin to spare no expense for his daughter's comfort, Richard furnishes the school's largest suite and leaves Sara with her mother's locket and a doll he names Emily, which he tells her will keep them connected through magic.

Although stifled by Miss Minchin's strictness, Sara becomes popular among the girls, including the scullery maid Becky, for her kindness and powerful imagination. Sara writes to her father, who is caught in a gas attack while trying to save a fellow soldier in the trenches. Miss Minchin throws Sara a lavish birthday party, hoping to extort more money from her father, but his solicitor arrives with news that Richard has been killed in battle; the British government has seized his assets, leaving Sara penniless. Miss Minchin moves Sara to the attic with Becky to work as a servant and confiscates her belongings, including the locket, allowing her to keep only Emily and a book.

Though her life is bleak, Sara remains kind to others, but gets her revenge on the school bully Lavinia. Charles Randolph, the school's elderly neighbor, receives word that his son John has been declared missing in action while fighting in Europe. Ram Dass, Mr. Randolph's Indian associate, comes to notice Sara from the neighboring attic, overhearing her imaginative stories. When a wounded soldier suffering from amnesia is misidentified as John, Ram Dass encourages Mr. Randolph to take the man in. Sara's friends sneak into Miss Minchin's office and recover her locket, visiting her that night to hear her tales of Prince Rama. They are caught by Miss Minchin, who punishes Sara and Becky with a day without meals, but Sara stands up to her cruelty with her father's belief that "all girls are princesses", no matter their lot in life.

Sara comforts Becky by imagining a feast and fine clothes for them, and they awaken to find the dream has come true, with their attic secretly transformed by Ram Dass. Inspired by Sara, Amelia runs away with the milkman, and Miss Minchin discovers the locket is missing. Confronting Sara in the attic, Miss Minchin accuses her of stealing the finery left by Ram Dass and summons the police. With Becky's help, Sara narrowly escapes by making the perilous climb over to the Randolph house. As Miss Minchin and the police search the house, Sara discovers the recovering soldier is none other than her father, but Richard does not recognize her. Though Miss Minchin does clearly recognize Captain Crewe, she spitefully says that Sara has no father. As Sara is dragged away by the police screaming for her father, Ram Dass helps Richard regain his memory. Outside Richard saves Sara and the two are happily reunited.

Sometime later, Mr. Randolph has taken over the school, now a much happier place for the girls, and has found peace in knowing that Richard tried to save his son. Richard's fortune has been restored and he has adopted Becky. As punishment for her vile treatment to the girls, Miss Minchin is reduced to working for a young chimney sweep she mistreated earlier. Sara gives Emily to the girls and shares an unexpected hug with Lavinia, before she and Becky depart for home.

Cast
 Liesel Matthews as Sara Crewe, the sweet, kind and caring daughter of Captain Richard Crewe.
 Eleanor Bron as Miss Maria Minchin, a cynical, cruel, greedy and heartless woman who runs a boarding school where Sara is enrolled. She is Amelia's older sister.
 Liam Cunningham as Captain Richard Crewe, Sara's loving devoted widower father.
 Liam Cunningham also portrays Prince Rama, a character from Sara's story.
 Vanessa Lee Chester as Becky, Miss Minchin's servant who lives in the attic of the school.
 Taylor Fry as Lavinia, a vindictive bully who is bitterly jealous of Sara's wealth and popularity.
 Heather DeLoach as Ermengarde, a shy, insecure girl often bullied by Lavinia and Miss Minchin.
 Kelsey Mulrooney as Lottie, a volatile girl at Sara's school prone to tantrums and fits.
 Rusty Schwimmer as Amelia Minchin, Miss Minchin's long-suffering sister.
 Arthur Malet as Charles Randolph, a kind old man that lives next door to the school. He is loosely based on Mr. Carrisford.
 Errol Sitahal as Ram Dass, Randolph's wise servant who later befriends Sara.
 Camilla Belle as Jane, Sara's schoolmate
 Rachael Bella as Betsy, Sara's schoolmate
 Kaitlin Cullum as Ruth, Sara's schoolmate
 Lauren Blumenfeld as Rosemary, Sara's schoolmate
 Darcie Bradford as Jesse, Sara's schoolmate
 Alexandra Rea-Baum as Gertrude, Sara's schoolmate
 Jonás Cuarón as Jim, the chimney sweep
 Ken Palmer as John Randolph
 Vincent Schiavelli as Mr. Barrow 
 Peggy Miley as Mabel, a cook who works for Miss Minchin.
 Time Winters as Frances, the milkman and Amelia's romantic interest
 Lomax Study as Monsieur Dufarge, a French teacher at Miss Minchin's school
 Alison Moir as Princess Sita, a character from Sara's story.
 Alison Moir also portrays Sara's mother, which only featured in picture into Sara's locket.

Soundtrack

All of the tracks were composed by Patrick Doyle. Three of the tracks feature soloists. The "String Quintet in C major Perger 108, MH 187" by Michael Haydn is also used in the film. The film also features the New London Children's Choir.

 "Ramayana: A Morning Raga" (2:03)
 "Children Running" (0:53)
 "Cristina Elisa Waltz" (3:03)
 "The Miss Minchin School for Girls" (1:40)
 "Knowing You by Heart" (2:32)
 "Breakfast" (0:55)
 "Letter to Papa" (1:38)
 "Angel Wings" (1:07)
 "False Hope" (2:05)
 "The Trenches" (1:00)
 "Crewe and the Soldier" (1:22)
 "Alone" (1:19)
 "The Attic" (2:00)
 "On Another's Sorrow" — Catherine Hopper (1:16)
 "The Shawl" (0:54)
 "Tyger Tyger" (0:32)
 "Compassion" (0:37)
 "For the Princess" (1:38)
 "Kindle My Heart" — Abigail Doyle (the daughter of the composer) (3:00)
 "The Locket Hunt" (3:02)
 "Midnight Tiptoe" (1:13)
 "I Am a Princess" (1:14)
 "Just Make Believe" (1:33)
 "Touched by an Angel" (1:43)
 "Emilia Elopes" (1:38)
 "The Escape" (2:58)
 "Papa!" (2:32)
 "Kindle My Heart" — Liesel Matthews (4:19)

Reception
A Little Princess received critical acclaim upon its release. On Rotten Tomatoes the film has a rating of 97% based on 36 reviews with an average rating of 8.2/10. The site's critical consensus states: "Alfonso Cuarón adapts Frances Hodgson Burnett's novel with a keen sense of magic realism, vividly recreating the world of childhood as seen through the characters".

Janet Maslin called the film "a bright, beautiful and enchantingly childlike vision", one that "draw[s] its audience into the wittily heightened reality of a fairy tale" and "takes enough liberties to re-invent rather than embalm Miss Burnett's assiduously beloved story". She concludes:

From the huge head of an Indian deity, used as a place where stories are told and children play, to the agile way a tear drips from Sara's eye to a letter read by her father in the rain, A Little Princess has been conceived, staged and edited with special grace. Less an actors' film than a series of elaborate tableaux, it has a visual eloquence that extends well beyond the limits of its story. To see Sara whirling ecstatically in her attic room on a snowy night, exulting in the feelings summoned by an evocative sight in a nearby window, is to know just how stirringly lovely a children's film can be.

Rita Kempley of The Washington Post called the film Cuarón's "dazzling North American [sic] debut" and wrote it "exquisitely re-creates the ephemeral world of childhood, an enchanted kingdom where everything, even make-believe, seems possible ... Unlike most distaff mythology, the film does not concern the heroine's sexual awakening; it's more like the typical hero's journey described by scholar Joseph Campbell. Sara, the adored Spoiled and pampered child of a wealthy British widower, must pass a series of tests, thereby discovering her inner strengths".

Awards

Home video release
A Little Princess was much more successful in the home video market than in theaters.  Warner Bros. sold two million copies for an estimated $32 million in video revenue—the studio receiving 75%—greatly exceeding box office gross. The film was first released on VHS and LaserDisc on September 19, 1995 and was first released on DVD on November 19, 1997.

See also

 Sarah... Ang Munting Prinsesa - a 1995 Filipino film adaptation of A Little Princess.

References

External links
 
 
 
 
 
 
 

1995 films
1995 drama films
American children's drama films
Remakes of American films
1990s English-language films
Films scored by Patrick Doyle
Films about children
Films about educators
Films based on A Little Princess
Films directed by Alfonso Cuarón
Films set in the 1910s
Films set in 1914
Films set in New York City
Magic realism films
Warner Bros. films
Films set in India
Films set in the British Raj
Films about father–daughter relationships
Films set in boarding schools
1990s American films